Shola Akinlade is a Nigerian software engineer and entrepreneur. He is the co-founder and CEO of Paystack, the company that was acquired by Stripe in 2020 for $200m.

Education 
Akinlade attended St. Gregory's College for his secondary education. In 2006, he graduated with a degree in Computer Science from Babcock University, Nigeria. Shola's career started at Heineken where he worked on their database management as a management trainee and moved on to being a software engineer with banks. In 2016, Akinlade and Ezra Olubi started Paystack.

Companies 
Akinlade's company Paystack was a part of startup accelerator YCombinator's 2016 batch of startups. The company was created to helps businesses in Africa get paid online and offline.

In 2022, Akinlade founded a football club, Sporting Lagos F.C. which he notes is a platform for community development and social change.

National honours 
In October 2022, Akinlade was conferred with the Officer of the Order of the Niger (OON) by President Muhammadu Buhari of Nigeria in recognition of his contributions to the advancement of technology in finance and business.

References 

Nigerian business executives
Babcock University alumni
Year of birth missing (living people)
Living people
Nigerian technology businesspeople
Yoruba businesspeople